1,8-Diazabicyclo[5.4.0]undec-7-ene, or more commonly DBU, is a chemical compound and belongs to the class of amidine compounds. It is used in organic synthesis as a catalyst, a complexing ligand, and a non-nucleophilic base.

Occurrence
Although all commercially available DBU is produced synthetically, it may also be isolated from the sea sponge Niphates digitalis. The biosynthesis of DBU has been proposed to begin with 1,6-hexanedial and 1,3-diaminopropane.

Uses
As a reagent in organic chemistry, DBU is used as a catalyst, a complexing ligand, and a non-nucleophilic base. It is also used as a curing agent for epoxy resins.

It is used in the separation of fullerenes in conjunction with trimethylbenzene. It reacts with C70 and higher fullerenes, but not with to C60 

It is also used as a catalyst in the production of polyurethanes. It also exhibited its dual character (base and nucleophile) in the synthesis of aryl- and styryl-terminal acetylenes.

See also
 1,5-Diazabicyclo[4.3.0]non-5-ene
 DABCO

References

Amidines
Reagents for organic chemistry
Non-nucleophilic bases